Barth is an Amt in the district of Vorpommern-Rügen, in Mecklenburg-Vorpommern, Germany. The seat of the Amt is in Barth.

The Amt Barth consists of the following municipalities:
Barth
Divitz-Spoldershagen
Fuhlendorf
Karnin
Kenz-Küstrow
Löbnitz
Lüdershagen
Pruchten
Saal
Trinwillershagen

References

Ämter in Mecklenburg-Western Pomerania